Oss also Osu（Japanese: おす or おっす）is a casual greeting in Japanese typically associated with male practitioners of Japanese martial arts.

"Oss!" is used outside Japan by some practitioners of Japanese martial arts and derived systems e.g. Brazilian jiujitsu.

There are various theories as to its origin, but the term is believed to have originated in the Japanese Navy or at Budo Senmon Gakko as a rough contraction of ohayō gozaimasu (おはようございます). In addition to use as a greeting, oss! can also function as "yessir!" when a subordinate is brusquely questioned by a teacher or superior officer.

It can be written in kanji as 押忍 but these are ateji applied after the term became common.

References

Japanese martial arts terminology
Japanese slang

ja:押忍